Heppner National Forest was established as the Heppner Forest Reserve by the U.S. Forest Service in Oregon on July 18, 1906 with .  It became a National Forest on March 4, 1907. On July 1, 1908 the entire forest was combined with part of Blue Mountains National Forest to establish  Umatilla National Forest and the name was discontinued.

References

External links
Forest History Society
Forest History Society:Listing of the National Forests of the United States Text from Davis, Richard C., ed. Encyclopedia of American Forest and Conservation History. New York: Macmillan Publishing Company for the Forest History Society, 1983. Vol. II, pp. 743-788.

 

Former National Forests of Oregon
1906 establishments in Oregon
Protected areas established in 1906
1908 disestablishments in Oregon